Live in Concert! Greatest Hits and More is a live album by New Jersey rock band The Smithereens, released in 2008 by Koch Records.

The album features music from The Smithereens' four-night stint at The Court Tavern in New Brunswick, New Jersey, which took place January 30 - February 2, 2008. The band, all hailing from surrounding Central Jersey towns, played the Court Tavern often at the start of their career. Jim Babjak: "There's no doubt the Court Tavern was our Cavern Club, so it was a natural choice". The band charged only $5 for admission, the same price as when they used to play there in the early 1980s. Kurt Reil of The Grip Weeds recorded all four nights on his portable studio equipment and later mixed the best performances at his House of Vibes studio.  
 
In addition to the band's best-known songs, the album features live recordings of two Pat DiNizio solo songs, "Any Other Way" and "Since You Went Away", originally released on his 2007 album, Pat DiNizio. The set also includes Buddy Holly's "Well All Right", and an interpretation of the "Batman Theme", a live staple for the band. Though the album's 11 minute version of "House We Used to Live In" wasn't planned, according to Babjak, the song always had an extended ending for live shows. "When I thought I was about to wrap up the jam at what is now the halfway point, Pat pulled out a harmonica", Babjak explained. "This surprise added a whole new dimension and I was thrilled when I heard the results. The chemistry between the four of us was really strong that night. Luckily, this spontaneous jam was captured on tape".

Track listing 
All songs written by Pat DiNizio, except where noted.

Personnel 
The Smithereens
Pat DiNizio – vocals, guitar
Jim Babjak – guitar, vocals
Severo "The Thrilla" Jornacion – bass, vocals
Dennis Diken – drums, vocals
Technical
Kurt Reil – engineer, mixing
Mike Olear – assistant
John Koneval – assistant
Kristin Pinell – assistant
Joe Lambert – mastering
Paul Grosso – creative direction
Andrew Kelley – art direction, design
Todd Sinclair - original cover concept
Anne M. Bray – front cover photography
Paulie Gee – back cover & inside booklet photography
Chris Jordan – liner notes

References

External links
Article 1
Article 2
Article 3
Article 4

The Smithereens albums
2008 live albums